The following is an overview of events in 1983 in film, including the highest-grossing films, award ceremonies and festivals, a list of films released and notable deaths.

Highest-grossing films (U.S.)

The top ten 1983 released films by box office gross in North America are as follows:

Events
February 11 - The Rolling Stones concert film Let's Spend the Night Together opens in New York City.
May 25 - Return of the Jedi, the final installment in the original Star Wars trilogy, is released. Like the previous films, it goes on to become the highest-grossing film of the year.
1983 was a landmark year in film. More films have gotten an R-rating than any other year thus far.
Academy Award winner Nicole Kidman makes her film debut in an Australian movie Bush Christmas
Brainstorm, the final film of screen star Natalie Wood, is released, 2 years after her death.
October - Frank Price resigns as president of Columbia Pictures and is replaced by Guy McElwaine.

Awards 

Palme d'Or (Cannes Film Festival):
The Ballad of Narayama (楢山節考), directed by Shohei Imamura, Japan

Golden Lion (Venice Film Festival):
Prénom Carmen (First Name: Carmen), directed by Jean-Luc Godard,

Golden Bear (Berlin Film Festival):
Ascendancy, directed by Edward Bennett, United Kingdom
The Beehive (La Colmena), directed by Mario Camus, Spain

Notable films released in 1983
United States unless stated

#
 10 to Midnight, directed by J. Lee Thompson, starring Charles Bronson

A
À Nos Amours (To Our Love), directed by Maurice Pialat, starring Sandrine Bonnaire - (France)
 Adi Shankaracharya, starring Sarvadaman Banerjee, the first film to be made in Sanskrit - (India)
All the Right Moves, starring Tom Cruise, Craig T. Nelson, Lea Thompson, Chris Penn
Americana, directed by and starring David Carradine
Amityville 3-D, directed by Richard Fleischer, starring Tony Roberts, Tess Harper, Robert Joy, Candy Clark
Among Grey Stones (Sredi serykh kamney) - (U.S.S.R.)
And the Ship Sails On (E la nave va), directed by Federico Fellini - (Italy)
Another Time, Another Place, starring Phyllis Logan - (U.K.)
Ardh Satya (Half Truth), directed by Govind Nihalani, starring Om Puri (Silver Lotus Award for best actor) - (India)
Ascendancy, starring Julie Covington and Ian Charleson, winner of Golden Bear award - (U.K.)
Austeria a.k.a. The Inn - Poland
Avtaar, directed by Mohan Kumar, starring Rajesh Khanna - (India)

B
BMX Bandits, starring Nicole Kidman - (Australia)
Baby It's You, directed by John Sayles, starring Rosanna Arquette and Vincent Spano
Bad Boys, starring Sean Penn, Esai Morales, Ally Sheedy, Clancy Brown
Le Bal (The Ball), directed by Ettore Scola - (Italy/France)
Balkan Express - (Yugoslavia)
The Ballad of Narayama, directed by Shohei Imamura (remake of the 1958 film) - (Japan) - Palme d'Or award
Barefoot Gen (Hadashi no gen) - (Japan)
Beauty and the Beast (Skønheden og udyret) - (Denmark)
La Bestia y la Espada Magica (The Beast and the Magic Sword) - (Spain/Japan)
Betaab (Impatient), starring Sunny Deol and Amrita Singh - (India)
Betrayal, starring Jeremy Irons and Ben Kingsley - (U.K.)
Better Late Than Never, starring David Niven and Art Carney
The Big Chill, directed by Lawrence Kasdan, starring Tom Berenger, Glenn Close, Jeff Goldblum, William Hurt, Kevin Kline, Mary Kay Place, Meg Tilly, JoBeth Williams, Don Galloway
Bill Cosby: Himself, a stand-up comedy performance
The Black Stallion Returns, starring Kelly Reno and Teri Garr
Bloodbath at the House of Death, starring Kenny Everett - (U.K.)
Blue Thunder, directed by John Badham, starring Roy Scheider, Daniel Stern, Malcolm McDowell, Candy Clark, Warren Oates
Born in Flames, a documentary film by Lizzie Borden
The Boys from Fengkuei (Feng gui lai de ren) - (Taiwan)
Brainstorm, starring Christopher Walken, Louise Fletcher, Cliff Robertson and, in her final film, Natalie Wood
Breathless, directed by Jim McBride, starring Richard Gere and Valerie Kaprisky
Bush Christmas, debut of Nicole Kidman - (Australia)

C
Can She Bake a Cherry Pie?, starring Karen Black
Careful, He Might Hear You - (Australia)
Carmen, directed by Carlos Saura - (Spain)
Champions, starring John Hurt - (U.K.)
Christine, directed by John Carpenter, starring Keith Gordon, John Stockwell, Alexandra Paul, Robert Prosky, Harry Dean Stanton, Kelly Preston
A Christmas Story, directed by Bob Clark, starring Peter Billingsley, Darren McGavin, Melinda Dillon
Circle of Power, starring Yvette Mimieux and Cindy Pickett
City of Pirates (La Ville des pirates) - (France)
Class, starring Rob Lowe, Andrew McCarthy, Jacqueline Bisset, Cliff Robertson
Les Compères (Co-Dads), starring Gérard Depardieu and Pierre Richard - (France)
Confidentially Yours (Vivement Dimanche), directed by François Truffaut, starring Fanny Ardant and Jean-Louis Trintignant - (France)
Cracking Up, directed by and starring Jerry Lewis
The Crimson Permanent Assurance, a Monty Python's short film directed by Terry Gilliam - (U.K.)
Cross Creek, starring Mary Steenburgen, Peter Coyote, Rip Torn, Alfre Woodard
Curse of the Pink Panther, directed by Blake Edwards - (U.K.)
Cujo, starring Dee Wallace and Danny Pintauro

D
D.C. Cab, starring Adam Baldwin, Mr. T, Gary Busey
Daffy Duck's Fantastic Island
Daniel, directed by Sidney Lumet, starring Timothy Hutton, Mandy Patinkin, Lindsay Crouse, Ellen Barkin
Danton, directed by Andrzej Wajda, starring Gérard Depardieu - (France/Poland/West Germany)
Dark Habits (Entre tinieblas), directed by Pedro Almodóvar - (Spain)
The Day After (made for television), starring Jason Robards, Steve Guttenberg, JoBeth Williams, John Lithgow
The Dead Zone, directed by David Cronenberg, starring Christopher Walken, Brooke Adams, Herbert Lom, Tom Skerritt, Martin Sheen
Deadly Run (Mortelle randonnee), starring Michel Serrault and Isabelle Adjani - (France)
Deal of the Century, directed by William Friedkin, starring Chevy Chase, Gregory Hines, Sigourney Weaver
The Death of Mario Ricci (La mort de Mario Ricci), starring Gian Maria Volonté - (Switzerland/France)
Le Dernier Combat (The Last Battle), directed by Luc Besson - (France)
Doctor Detroit, starring Dan Aykroyd, Howard Hesseman, Donna Dixon, Fran Drescher, Lynn Whitfield
The Dragon That Wasn't (Or Was He?) (Als je begrijpt wat ik bedoel) - (Netherlands)
The Dresser, directed by Peter Yates, starring Albert Finney and Tom Courtenay - (U.K.)
Duvar - (Turkey)

E
Easy Money, starring Rodney Dangerfield, Joe Pesci, Geraldine Fitzgerald, Jennifer Jason Leigh
Eddie and the Cruisers, starring Michael Paré and Tom Berenger
Eddie Macon's Run, starring Kirk Douglas and John Schneider
Educating Rita, directed by Lewis Gilbert, starring Michael Caine and Julie Walters - (U.K.)
El Norte, directed by Gregory Nava - (UK/US)
El Sur (The South) - (Spain)
Entre Nous (Between Us), starring Miou-Miou and Isabelle Huppert - (France)
Eréndira, starring Irene Papas - (Mexico)
Eureka, directed by Nicolas Roeg, starring Gene Hackman, Rutger Hauer, Theresa Russell, Mickey Rourke, Joe Pesci
Exposed, directed by James Toback, starring Nastassja Kinski, Rudolf Nureyev, Harvey Keitel

F
The Family Game (Kazoku Gēmu), directed by Yoshimitsu Morita - (Japan)
Ferestadeh - (United States/West Germany)
Flashdance, directed by Adrian Lyne, starring Jennifer Beals and Michael Nouri
Flesh of Your Flesh (Carne de tu carne) - (Colombia)
Forbidden Relations (Visszaesök) - (Hungary)
The Fourth Man (De Vierde Man), directed by Paul Verhoeven - (Netherlands)
Funny Dirty Little War (No habrá más penas ni olvido) - (Argentina)

G
Gabriela, Cravo e Canela, starring Sônia Braga and Marcello Mastroianni - (Brazil)
Get Crazy, directed by Allan Arkush, starring Malcolm McDowell, Allen Garfield, Daniel Stern, Lou Reed, Lee Ving
Gorky Park, directed by Michael Apted, starring William Hurt, Lee Marvin, Joanna Pacuła, Ian Bannen, Brian Dennehy
Growing Up (Xiao Bi de gu shi) - (Taiwan)
Gunman (Mue puen) - (Thailand)

H
Heart Like a Wheel, directed by Jonathan Kaplan, starring Bonnie Bedelia and Beau Bridges
Heat and Dust, directed by James Ivory, starring Julie Christie, Greta Scacchi, Shashi Kapoor - (U.K.)
High Road to China, starring Tom Selleck and Bess Armstrong
The Honorary Consul, starring Michael Caine and Richard Gere - (U.K.)
The Hound of the Baskervilles (American film shot in England) a Sherlock Holmes mystery directed by Douglas Hickox, starring Ian Richardson as Holmes and Donald Churchill as Watson; co-starred Denholm Elliott and Edward Judd
The Hunger, directed by Tony Scott, starring Catherine Deneuve, David Bowie, Susan Sarandon - (U.K.)

I
The Illusionist - (Netherlands)
In the White City (Dans la ville blanche), directed by Alain Tanner, starring Bruno Ganz - (Switzerland)
Independence Day, starring Kathleen Quinlan, David Keith, Cliff DeYoung, Frances Sternhagen, Dianne Wiest

J
Jaane Bhi Do Yaaro (Just Let it Go, Friends), starring Naseeruddin Shah - (India)
Jaws 3-D, starring Dennis Quaid, Bess Armstrong, Louis Gossett Jr.
Un jeu brutal (A Brutal Game) - (France)

K
The Keep, directed by Michael Mann, starring Scott Glenn, Jurgen Prochnow, Alberta Watson, Ian McKellen, Gabriel Byrne, Robert Prosky
King for a Day (Gospodin za edin den) - (Bulgaria)
The King of Comedy, directed by Martin Scorsese, starring Robert De Niro, Sandra Bernhard, Jerry Lewis
Krull, directed by Peter Yates, starring Ken Marshall, Lysette Anthony, Francesca Annis, Liam Neeson - (U.K.)

L
L'Argent (Money), directed by Robert Bresson - (France)
Last Year's Snow Was Falling (Padal proshlogodniy sneg) - (U.S.S.R.)
Lianna, directed by John Sayles, starring Linda Griffiths
Liquid Sky, starring Anne Carlisle
Local Hero, directed by Bill Forsyth, starring Peter Riegert, Denis Lawson, Peter Capaldi, Burt Lancaster - (U.K.)
Lone Wolf McQuade, starring Chuck Norris, David Carradine, Barbara Carrera
The Lords of Discipline, starring David Keith and Mark Breland
Losin' It, directed by Curtis Hanson, starring Tom Cruise and Shelley Long
Lovesick, starring Dudley Moore, Elizabeth McGovern, Alec Guinness

M
The Makioka Sisters (Sasame-yuki), directed by Kon Ichikawa - (Japan)
The Man in the Silk Hat (L'homme au chapeau de soie), a documentary about Max Linder - (France)
Man of Flowers, starring Norman Kaye - (Australia)
The Man Who Loved Women, directed by Blake Edwards, starring Burt Reynolds, Julie Andrews, Marilu Henner, Kim Basinger
The Man with Two Brains, directed by Carl Reiner, starring Steve Martin and Kathleen Turner
Mandi, directed by Shyam Benegal - (India)
Moon in the Gutter, directed by Jean-Jacques Beineix, starring Gérard Depardieu and Nastassja Kinski
Masoom (The Innocent), starring Naseeruddin Shah - (India)
Max Dugan Returns, directed by Herbert Ross, starring Marsha Mason, Jason Robards, Donald Sutherland, Matthew Broderick
Merry Christmas, Mr. Lawrence (Senjō no Merī Kurisumasu), directed by Nagisa Oshima, starring David Bowie, Tom Conti, Ryuichi Sakamoto, Takeshi Kitano - (Japan/U.K.)
Mickey's Christmas Carol, a featurette which brings Mickey Mouse back to cinemas for first time since 1953
Monty Python's The Meaning of Life, directed by Terry Jones, starring Graham Chapman, John Cleese, Terry Gilliam, Eric Idle, Michael Palin and Jones - (U.K.)
Mr. Mom, starring Michael Keaton, Teri Garr, Martin Mull
My Brother's Wedding, directed by Charles Burnett

N
Nankyoku Monogatari (South Pole Story) - (Japan)
Narcissus - (Canada)
Nate and Hayes, starring Tommy Lee Jones and Michael O'Keefe
National Lampoon's Vacation, directed by Harold Ramis, starring Chevy Chase and Beverly D'Angelo
Nešto između - (Yugoslavia)
Never Cry Wolf, starring Charles Martin Smith and Brian Dennehy
Never Say Never Again, starring Sean Connery (as James Bond) with Barbara Carrera, Kim Basinger, Klaus Maria Brandauer - (U.K.)
A Night in Heaven, starring Christopher Atkins and Lesley Ann Warren
Nightmares, starring Cristina Raines and Emilio Estevez
Nostalghia, directed by Andrei Tarkovsky, starring Oleg Yankovsky and Erland Josephson - (U.S.S.R./Italy)

O
Octopussy, starring Roger Moore (as James Bond) with Maud Adams and Louis Jourdan - (U.K.)
Of Unknown Origin, starring Peter Weller - (United States/Canada)
One Deadly Summer (L'été meurtrier), starring Isabelle Adjani - (France)
The Osterman Weekend, directed by Sam Peckinpah, starring Rutger Hauer, John Hurt, Craig T. Nelson, Dennis Hopper, Meg Foster, Helen Shaver, Burt Lancaster, Dennis Hopper, Chris Sarandon
The Outsiders, directed by Francis Ford Coppola, starring C. Thomas Howell, Matt Dillon, Ralph Macchio, Rob Lowe, Patrick Swayze, Emilio Estevez, Tom Cruise, Diane Lane, Leif Garrett

P
Pauline at the Beach (Pauline à la plage), directed by Éric Rohmer - (France)
Phar Lap, starring Tom Burlinson - (Australia)
The Pirates of Penzance, a Gilbert and Sullivan operetta, starring Kevin Kline, Rex Smith, Angela Lansbury, Linda Ronstadt - (US/UK)
The Ploughman's Lunch, starring Jonathan Pryce - (U.K.)
Prénom Carmen (First Name: Carmen), directed by Jean-Luc Godard - (France) - Golden Lion award
The Prey, starring Debbie Thureson and Steve Bond
Private School, starring Phoebe Cates, Matthew Modine, Betsy Russell, Ray Walston
Project A (A Gai Wak), starring Jackie Chan and Sammo Hung - (Hong Kong)
Psycho II, directed by Richard Franklin, starring Anthony Perkins, Vera Miles, Meg Tilly and Robert Loggia

R
Rebetiko - (Greece)
Return of the Jedi, directed by Richard Marquand, starring Mark Hamill, Harrison Ford, Carrie Fisher
Reuben, Reuben, starring Tom Conti and Kelly McGillis
The Right Stuff, directed by Philip Kaufman, starring Scott Glenn, Sam Shepard, Ed Harris, Fred Ward, Dennis Quaid, Barbara Hershey, Pamela Reed
Risky Business, directed by Paul Brickman, starring Tom Cruise and Rebecca De Mornay
Rock & Rule, an animated rock musical - (Canada)
Romantic Comedy, directed by Arthur Hiller, starring Dudley Moore and Mary Steenburgen
Rumble Fish, directed by Francis Ford Coppola, starring Matt Dillon, Mickey Rourke, Diane Lane, Vincent Spano, Diana Scarwid, Nicolas Cage, Dennis Hopper
Running Brave, starring Robby Benson

S
Sagara Sangamam (The Confluence) - (India)
Sadma (Trauma) - (India)
Sahara, starring Brooke Shields and Horst Buchholz
Sans Soleil (Sunless), directed by Chris Marker - (France)
A Season in Hakkari (Hakkâri'de Bir Mevsim) - (Turkey)
Scarface, directed by Brian De Palma, starring Al Pacino, Steven Bauer, Michelle Pfeiffer, Mary Elizabeth Mastrantonio, Robert Loggia
The Scarlet and the Black, directed by Jerry London, starring Gregory Peck, Christopher Plummer, John Gielgud
Sheer Madness (Heller Wahn), directed by Margarethe von Trotta, starring Hanna Schygulla - (West Germany)
The Sign of Four (American film shot in England) a Sherlock Holmes mystery directed by Desmond Davis, starring Ian Richardson as Holmes and David Healy as Watson
Silkwood, directed by Mike Nichols, starring Meryl Streep, Kurt Russell, Cher
Sleepaway Camp, starring Mike Kellin
Smokey and the Bandit Part 3, starring Jackie Gleason and Jerry Reed
So Long, Stooge (Tchao Pantin), directed by Claude Berri - (France)
Something Wicked This Way Comes, starring Jason Robards and Jonathan Pryce
Spacehunter: Adventures in the Forbidden Zone, directed by Lamont Johnson, starring Peter Strauss and Molly Ringwald
Star 80, directed by Bob Fosse, starring Mariel Hemingway and Eric Roberts
The Star Chamber, starring Michael Douglas and Hal Holbrook
Staying Alive, directed by Sylvester Stallone, starring John Travolta, Cynthia Rhodes, Finola Hughes
The Sting II, starring Jackie Gleason, Mac Davis, Karl Malden, Oliver Reed, Teri Garr
Strange Brew, starring Rick Moranis and Dave Thomas - (Canada)
Strange Invaders, starring Paul Le Mat, Nancy Allen, Diana Scarwid
Stray Dogs (Deulgae) - (South Korea)
Streamers, directed by Robert Altman, starring Matthew Modine and David Alan Grier
Stroker Ace, directed by Hal Needham, starring Burt Reynolds, Loni Anderson, Jim Nabors, Ned Beatty, Parker Stevenson
Sudden Impact, directed by and starring Clint Eastwood, with Sondra Locke
Sugar Cane Alley (Rue Cases-Negres) - (France/Martinique)
Superman III, directed by Richard Lester, starring Christopher Reeve, Richard Pryor, Annette O'Toole, Pamela Stephenson, Robert Vaughn
The Survivors, starring Walter Matthau and Robin Williams
Sweet Bunch, directed by Nikos Nikolaidis - (Greece)

T
Table for Five, starring Jon Voight, Marie-Christine Barrault, Richard Crenna, Millie Perkins, Roxana Zal
Tender Mercies, directed by Bruce Beresford, starring Robert Duvall, Tess Harper, Betty Buckley, Ellen Barkin
Terms of Endearment, directed by James L. Brooks, starring Shirley MacLaine, Debra Winger, Jack Nicholson, Danny DeVito, Jeff Daniels, John Lithgow
Testament, starring Jane Alexander, William Devane, Leon Ames, Roxana Zal
The Thorn Birds, TV miniseries, starring Rachel Ward, Richard Chamberlain, Bryan Brown, Christopher Plummer, Barbara Stanwyck
Three Crowns of the Sailor (Les Trois couronnes du matelot) - (France)
Tight Quarters (Könnyű testi sértés) - (Hungary)
To Be or Not to Be, starring Mel Brooks, Anne Bancroft, Tim Matheson, Charles Durning, José Ferrer
Toki o Kakeru Shōjo (The Little Girl who Conquered Time) - (Japan)
Tough Enough, starring Dennis Quaid, Warren Oates, Stan Shaw
Trading Places, directed by John Landis, starring Dan Aykroyd, Eddie Murphy, Jamie Lee Curtis, Denholm Elliott, Ralph Bellamy, Don Ameche
Trenchcoat, starring Margot Kidder and Robert Hays
Twenty Years of African Cinema a.k.a. Caméra d'Afrique - (Tunisia)
Twilight Zone: The Movie, segments directed by John Landis, Steven Spielberg, Joe Dante and George Miller, starring Vic Morrow, Scatman Crothers, Kathleen Quinlan, John Lithgow
Twice Upon a Time
Two of a Kind, directed by John Herzfeld, starring John Travolta and Olivia Newton-John

U
Uncommon Valor, directed by Ted Kotcheff, starring Gene Hackman, Fred Ward, Robert Stack, Randall "Tex" Cobb, Patrick Swayze
Under Fire, directed by Roger Spottiswoode, starring Nick Nolte, Gene Hackman, Joanna Cassidy
Utu - (New Zealand)

V
Valley Girl, starring Deborah Foreman and Nicolas Cage
The Very Late Afternoon of a Faun (Faunovo velmi pozdní odpoledne) - (Czechoslovakia)
Videodrome, directed by David Cronenberg, starring James Woods and Deborah Harry - (Canada)
Vigilante, starring Robert Forster
Vlyublyon po sobstvennomu zhelaniyu (Love by Request) - (U.S.S.R.)
Voyage in Time (Tempo di Viaggio), directed by Tonino Guerra and Andrei Tarkovsky - (Italy)

W
Walking, Walking (Cammina, cammina), directed by Ermanno Olmi - (Italy)
WarGames, directed by John Badham, starring Matthew Broderick, Dabney Coleman, Ally Sheedy
Wartime Romance (Voenno-polevoy roman), directed by Pyotr Todorovsky - (U.S.S.R.)
We Are from Jazz (My iz dzhaza) - (U.S.S.R.)
Wild style, directed by Charlie Ahearn.
The Wind in the Willows, starring Richard Pearson, Ian Carmichael, David Jason and Michael Hordern - (U.K.)
The Winds of War, TV mini-series, starring Robert Mitchum, Ali MacGraw, Polly Bergen, Peter Graves, John Houseman, Ralph Bellamy
Winnie the Pooh and a Day for Eeyore
Without a Trace, starring Kate Nelligan and Judd Hirsch
The Wounded Man (l'Homme blessé) - (France)

Y
Yellowbeard, starring Graham Chapman, Peter Boyle, Marty Feldman, Eric Idle, John Cleese, Peter Cook, Cheech & Chong - (U.K.)
Yentl, directed by and starring Barbra Streisand, with Mandy Patinkin and Amy Irving - Golden Globe Award for Best Picture (Musical or Comedy)

Z
Zappa, directed by Bille August - (Denmark)
Zelig, directed by and starring Woody Allen, with Mia Farrow
Zu Warriors from the Magic Mountain (Xin shu shan jian ke), starring Sammo Hung - (Hong Kong)

1983 Wide-release films in the U.S.

January–March

April–June

July–September

October–December

Births
January 2 - Kate Bosworth, American actress
January 9 - Kerry Condon, Irish actress
January 13 - Julian Morris, British actor
January 16 - Marwan Kenzari, Dutch actor
January 23 - Svetlana Khodchenkova, Russian actress
January 24 - Frankie Grande, American actor, singer, producer, television host and YouTube personality
February 4 – Hannibal Buress, American comedian, actor, writer and producer
February 7 - Elina Purde, Estonian actress
February 16 - Agyness Deyn, English actress and model
February 18 - Evan Jonigkeit, American actor
February 20 - Bronson Webb, British actor
February 21 - Mélanie Laurent, French actress
February 22 - Taraka Ratna, Indian actor (died 2023)
February 23
Aziz Ansari, American actor, writer, producer, director and comedian
Emily Blunt, English actress
February 27 - Kate Mara, American actress
March 1 - Lupita Nyong'o, Kenyan-Mexican actress and director
March 4 - Julieta Zylberberg, Argentine actress
March 10
Rafe Spall, English actor
Carrie Underwood, American singer-songwriter and actress
March 11 - Lucy DeVito, American actress
March 12 - Ron Funches, American actor, comedian and writer
March 14 - Johnny Flynn, British actor, musician and singer-songwriter
March 15 - Sean Biggerstaff, Scottish actor
March 17 - Christian and Joseph Cousins, American twin actors
March 20 - Michael Cassidy (actor), American actor
March 21 - Justin McDonald, British actor
March 29 - Ed Skrein, English actor, director, screenwriter and rapper
March 31 - Ashleigh Ball, Canadian singer, musician and voice actress                     
April 1 - Matt Lanter, American actor
April 4 - Amanda Righetti, American actress
April 6 - Diora Baird, American actress and former model
April 7 - Kyle Labine, Canadian actor
April 10 - Jamie Chung, American actress and former reality television personality
April 15 - Alice Braga, Brazilian actress and producer
April 19 - Victoria Yeates, English actress
April 21 - Gugu Mbatha-Raw, British actress
April 22 - Francis Capra, American actor
May 3 - Ari Magder, Canadian actor (died 2012)
May 4
Brad Bufanda, American actor (died 2017)
Jesse Moss, Canadian actor
May 5 - Henry Cavill, British actor
May 6
Adrianne Palicki, American actress
Gabourey Sidibe, American actress
May 9 - Michael Roark, American actor
May 11 - Holly Valance, Australian actress and singer
May 12 - Domhnall Gleeson, Irish actor, writer, and director
May 14 - Amber Tamblyn, American actress, writer, and director
May 17 - Ginger Gonzaga, American comedian and actress
May 28 - Megalyn Echikunwoke, American actress
June 1 - Sylvia Hoeks, Dutch actress
June 2 - Yuliya Snigir, Russian actress and model
June 10 - Leelee Sobieski, American retired actress
June 14 - Louis Garrel, French actor and filmmaker
June 16 - Olivia Hack, American actress
June 23 - Miles Fisher, American actor, comedian and musician
June 24 - John Lloyd Cruz, Filipino actor
June 28 - Scott Haze, American actor and filmmaker
June 30 - Angela Sarafyan, Armenian-American actress
July 6 - Christine Firkins, Canadian former actress
July 8 - DeVaughn Nixon, American actor
July 10 - Golshifteh Farahani, Iranian actress
July 18 - Cara Gee, Canadian actress
July 20 - Martin McCann (actor), Irish actor
July 23 - Olamide Faison, American actor and singer
July 28 - Dhanush, Indian actor
August 1 - Inga Salurand, Estonian actress
August 3 - Mamie Gummer, American actress
August 4 - Greta Gerwig, American director, writer, and actress
August 7 - Brit Marling, American actress and screenwriter
August 8
Guy Burnet, British actor
Trina Nishimura, American voice actress
August 10 - Bonnie Piesse, Australian actress and singer-songwriter
August 11 - Chris Hemsworth, Australian actor
August 14
Mila Kunis, actress
Lamorne Morris, American actor, comedian and television personality
August 16 - Dominik García-Lorido, American actress
August 19 - Mike Moh, American actor and martial artist
August 20 - Andrew Garfield, English actor
August 23 - Annie Ilonzeh, American actress
August 24 - Antonio Campos, American film director
August 29 - Jennifer Landon, American actress
September 9 - Zoe Kazan, American actress and screenwriter
September 21
Scott Evans, American actor
Maggie Grace, American actress
Joseph Mazzello, American actor
September 25 - Donald Glover, American actor, singer, comedian, writer, producer and director
October 3 - Tessa Thompson, American actress
October 5
Jesse Eisenberg, American actor, director, producer, and writer
Shelby Rabara, Filipino-American actress and dancer
Noot Seear, Canadian actress
Noah Segan, American actor
October 9 - Spencer Grammer, American actress
October 10 - Layke Anderson, British director and former actor
October 17 - Felicity Jones, English actress
October 19 - Rebecca Ferguson, Swedish actress
October 24 - Katie McGrath, Irish actress
October 28 - Joe Thomas, English actor, writer and comedian
October 29 - Johnny Lewis, American actor (died 2012)
November 7 - Adam DeVine, American actor, comedian, screenwriter, producer and singer
November 8 - Chris Rankin, New Zealand-born British actor
November 15 - Sophia Di Martino, English actress
November 19 - Adam Driver, American actor
December 8 - Utkarsh Ambudkar, American actor, singer and rapper
December 10
Patrick Flueger, American actor
Xavier Samuel, Australian actor
December 13 - Satya Bhabha, British-American actor
December 17 - Stef Dawson, Australian actress
December 20 - Jonah Hill, American actor, filmmaker, and comedian
December 23 - Joe Dinicol, Canadian actor

Deaths

Film debuts 
Curtis Armstrong - Risky Business
Rowan Atkinson - Never Say Never Again
Kathy Baker - The Right Stuff
Steven Bauer - Scarface
Juliette Binoche - Liberty Belle
Mark Boone Junior - Variety
Matthew Broderick - Max Dugan Returns
Clancy Brown - Bad Boys
Jim Carrey - All in Good Taste
Nancy Cartwright - Twilight Zone: The Movie
Wendy Crewson - Skullduggery
John Cusack - Class
Lolita Davidovich - Class
Warwick Davis - Return of the Jedi
Vincent D'Onofrio - The First Turn-On!
Chris Elliott - Lianna
Matt Frewer - The Lords of Discipline
Andy García - Blue Skies Again
Mary Pat Gleason - Easy Money
Crispin Glover - My Tutor
John Goodman - Eddie Macon's Run
Kelsey Grammer - WarGames
Graham Greene - Running Brave
David Alan Grier - Streamers
Lukas Haas - Testament
Tess Harper - Tender Mercies
Nicole Kidman - Bush Christmas
Jane Krakowski - National Lampoon's Vacation
Maurice LaMarche - Rock & Rule
Al Leong - Twilight Zone: The Movie
Ray Liotta - The Lonely Lady
Rob Lowe - The Outsiders
Virginia Madsen - Class
Camryn Manheim - Sudden Impact
Andrew McCarthy - Class
Kelly McGillis - Reuben, Reuben
Peter McRobbie - Zelig
Julio Oscar Mechoso - Guaguasi
Matthew Modine - Baby It's You
Rick Moranis - Strange Brew
Megan Mullally - Risky Business
Judd Nelson - Rock 'n' Roll Hotel
Afemo Omilami - Trading Places
Sarah Jessica Parker - Somewhere Tomorrow
Alexandra Paul - American Nightmare
Bronson Pinchot - Risky Business
Kevin Pollak - The Right Stuff
Kelly Preston - 10 to Midnight
Paul Rodriguez - D.C. Cab
Mimi Rogers - Blue Skies Again
Alan Ruck - Bad Boys
Ally Sheedy - Bad Boys
Elisabeth Shue - Somewhere Tomorrow
Kiefer Sutherland - Max Dugan Returns
Lea Thompson - Jaws 3-D
J. T. Walsh - Eddie Macon's Run
Julie Walters - Educating Rita
Lynn Whitfield - Doctor Detroit
Kathleen Wilhoite - Private School

See also

 List of American films of 1983
 List of British films of 1983
 List of French films of 1983
 List of German films of the 1980s
 List of Bollywood films of 1983
 List of Italian films of 1983
 List of Japanese films of 1983
 List of Swedish films of the 1980s

References

 
Film by year